Outremont is a federal electoral district in Montreal, Quebec, Canada, that has been represented in the House of Commons of Canada since 1935. It was known as Outremont—Saint-Jean from 1947 to 1966. Its population in 2006 was 95,711. Its current Member of Parliament is Rachel Bendayan of the Liberal Party of Canada.

Demographics
According to the Canada 2011 Census

Ethnic groups: 69.5% White, 6.9% Black, 6.7% Arab, 3.8% Latino, 2.8% Filipino, 2.4% South Asian, 2.1% Southeast Asian, 2.0% Chinese, 1.7% Indigenous, 2.1% Other
Languages: 47.9% French, 16.5% English, 5.4% Arabic, 4.8% Yiddish, 4.6% Spanish, 1.9% Portuguese, 1.8% Greek, 1.5% Romanian, 1.4% Tagalog, 1.3% Russian, 12.9% Other
Religions: 50.7% Christian, 11.0% Jewish, 9.5% Muslim, 1.3% Buddhist, 1.2% Hindu, 0.3% Other, 26.0% None
Median income: $22,551 (2010) 
Average income: $39,486 (2010)

According to the Canada 2016 Census
 Languages: (2016) 54.9% French, 23.5% English, 4.9% Yiddish, 2.7% Spanish, 2.4% Arabic, 1.5% Farsi, 1.1% Portuguese, 0.9% Greek, 0.9% Romanian, 0.8% Tagalog, 0.8% Russian, 0.8% Mandarin, 0.6% Vietnamese

Geography 
The district includes the borough of Outremont, the eastern part of Côte-des-Neiges in the borough of Côte-des-Neiges—Notre-Dame-de-Grâce, and the western part of Mile End in the borough of Le Plateau-Mont-Royal, plus bits of upper Downtown Montreal in the borough of Ville-Marie, La Petite-Patrie in the borough of Rosemont–La Petite-Patrie, and Parc Extension in the borough of Villeray–Saint-Michel–Parc-Extension.

Political geography 
In the 2006 election, the Liberals had their strongest support in Côte-des-Neiges, on the eastern slopes of Mont-Royal and in the small part of the riding in the Parc-Extension neighbourhood. The Bloc had its support concentrated in the borough of Outremont, and around the Université de Montréal. The New Democratic Party (NDP) won all of its polls in Mile-End where it obtained most of its polls. The Conservatives won just three polls in the riding all of which were around the western border of the Outremont border.

In the 2007 by-election, the NDP almost swept the riding. Their strongest areas were in Mile-End, Jeanne-Mance, and around the Université de Montréal. It was not uncommon for the NDP win more than 70% of the vote in these polls. The Bloc Québécois vote had collapsed, most of which went to the NDP. They did not win a single poll. Liberal support was relegated to the small part of Parc-Extension in the riding, the area around Rue Jean-Talon and the area on the opposite side of Mount Royal along Avenue des Pins. The Conservatives held on to one of their three polls.

In the 2008 election, the NDP held on to Outremont, albeit with a lower percentage of overall support.

Until the 2011 election, this riding was the only riding in Quebec to be held by the NDP. Mulcair held it since winning a by-election in 2007, earning a seat for the party for only the second time in history. He was challenged in 2011 by Liberal Martin Cauchon, who held this riding from 1993 to 2004 and was a former cabinet minister.

History 
The electoral district was created in 1933 from parts of Laurier—Outremont and Mount Royal ridings.

This riding lost territory to Papineau, Notre-Dame-de-Grâce—Westmount, Laurier—Sainte-Marie, Ville-Marie—Le Sud-Ouest—Île-des-Sœurs and Rosemont—La Petite-Patrie, and gained territory from Laurier—Sainte-Marie, Westmount—Ville-Marie and Mount Royal during the 2012 electoral redistribution.

2007 by-election 

After the resignation of Jean Lapierre on 28 January 2007, a by-election was called for 17 September 2007. In the by-election, this riding was won by the NDP candidate Thomas Mulcair.

Mulcair retained the riding for the NDP in the 2008 federal election, marking the NDP's first re-election and first general election victory in Quebec.

2019 by-election

Former boundaries

Members of Parliament 

This riding has elected the following Members of Parliament:

Election results

Outremont, 1968–present 

Source: Official Results, Elections Canada and Financial Returns, Elections Canada.

Outremont—Saint-Jean, 1949–1968 

|Esprit social
|Henri-Georges Grenier
|align=right| 214
|align=right|1.87%
|align=right|−0.19%

|Droit vital personnel
|Henri-Georges Grenier
|align=right| 465
|align=right|2.06%
|align=right|

Note: Ralliement créditiste vote is compared to Social Credit vote in the 1963 election.

Note: NDP vote is compared to CCF vote in 1958 election.

|Independent Progressive Conservative
|Homère Louiselle
|align=right| 180
|align=right|1.07%
|align=right|

|Independent Liberal
|Raymond Bourque
|align=right| 442
|align=right|3.93%

Outremont, 1935–1949 

Note: "National Government" vote is compared to Conservative vote in 1935 election.

See also 
 List of Canadian federal electoral districts
 Past Canadian electoral districts

References

Notes

External links 
Riding history from the Library of Parliament
 2011 Results from Elections Canada

Federal electoral districts of Montreal
Outremont, Quebec
Le Plateau-Mont-Royal
Downtown Montreal
Villeray–Saint-Michel–Parc-Extension
Rosemont–La Petite-Patrie